"When You're Young and in Love" is a song composed by Van McCoy which first became a Top 40 hit single for the Marvelettes in 1967: a remake by the Flying Pickets would reach the UK Top Ten in 1984.

Original version: Ruby & the Romantics

Background
The first recording of the song was by Ruby & the Romantics; like all the group's singles on Kapp Records the track was produced by label a&r head Allen Stanton. Released in September 1964, "When You're Young..." reached the Top Five in Honolulu but otherwise failed to register strongly in any US market reaching #48 on the Billboard Hot 100 in November 1964.  Ruby & the Romantics scored one subsequent Hot 100 placing, with "Does He Really Care For Me" (#87). However, "When You're Young..." was a bigger hit in Canada, peaking at #25 on the RPM "Top Tracks".

Personnel
Lead vocal by Ruby Nash
Background vocals by Ed Roberts, George Lee, Ronald Mosley, and Leroy Fann
Instrumentation by Unknown

The Marvelettes version

Background
The song was covered in 1967 by the Marvelettes with the track - produced by James Dean and William Weatherspoon - reaching #23 on the Hot 100 that June; its R&B peak was #9. Although not one of the Marvelettes' very biggest US hits, "When You're Young and in Love" became the only record by the group to achieve hit status in the UK with a #13 peak in July 1967. The track is also one of the last Marvelettes' singles to feature Gladys Horton although the lead is by Wanda Young; Horton would only appear, and lead, on the following two B-Sides. Besides Horton and veteran Marvelette Katherine Anderson, Rogers' vocal backing on "When You're Young..." features Motown's premier session singers the Andantes while the original instrumental backing on the track by the Funk Brothers was augmented by the Detroit Symphony Orchestra.

Personnel
Lead vocal by Wanda Young Rogers
Background vocals by Gladys Horton and Katherine Anderson and The Andantes: Marlene Barrow, Jackie Hicks and Louvain Demps
Instrumentation by The Funk Brothers and the Detroit Symphony Orchestra

Charts

Flying Pickets version
The song had its strongest chart impact via a 1984 cover version by the Flying Pickets, produced by  John Sherry. It reached number 7 in the UK. This version of the song was featured in Netflix's Sex Education (TV series).

Other versions
In the autumn of 1975 competing versions of "When You're Young and in Love" by Ralph Carter and the Choice Four charted R&B with the Carter version reaching #37 on the R&B charts where the Choice Four peaked at #45; both versions were also minor Hot 100 crossovers with respective peaks of #95 (Carter) and #91 (Choice Four). Ralph Carter would promote his version with a performance on the April 3, 1976 episode of his Good Times sitcom; his recording was produced by Norman Bergen and Reid Whitelaw. The Choice Four version was produced by the song's composer Van McCoy.
A 1979 remake of "When You're Young and in Love" is notable as the debut single for Stacy Lattisaw and also for being produced by composer Van McCoy; however the McCoy produced album Young and in Love proved neither a critical or commercial success upon release in July 1979 - the month of McCoy's death - with the "When You're Young..." single barely registering on the R&B charts at #91.
Gitte made a recording of "When You're Young and in Love" on 23 October 1964. 
The song has also been recorded by Donny and Marie - as "(When You're) Young and in Love"
The Jets recorded it, for their 1987 album Magic.

References

1964 singles
1967 singles
The Marvelettes songs
Songs written by Van McCoy
1984 singles
The Flying Pickets songs
1979 debut singles
Stacy Lattisaw songs
Ruby & the Romantics songs
Tamla Records singles
1964 songs